The Wolf Creek Shooting Complex, now known as the Tom Lowe Shooting Grounds, is a shooting range located southwest of Atlanta, Georgia, United States, in Fulton County. During the 1996 Summer Olympics, it hosted the shooting event. Until 2002, it was also often used for ISSF World Cup competitions in rifle and pistol events, although such competitions, when held in the United States, have now reverted to being carried out at Fort Benning.

The venue is now owned by the Parks & Recreation Department of Fulton County.

It has 20 trap and skeet shooting combination fields, and nine lighted areas.

The facility has been host to several NSSA State and Zone skeet tournaments.

The range is also home to recreational shooting leagues such as the Atlanta Skeet and Trap League.

References
1996 Summer Olympics official report. Volume 1. p. 544.
1996 Summer Olympics official report. Volume 3. p. 460.
Claytargetsonline.com profile.
Georgia Trapshooting Association profile.
Atlanta Skeet and Trap League
National Skeet Shooting Association

Venues of the 1996 Summer Olympics
Buildings and structures in Fulton County, Georgia
Olympic shooting venues
Shooting ranges in the United States
Sports venues in Georgia (U.S. state)